Sugarcane juice is the liquid extracted from pressed sugarcane. It is consumed as a beverage in many places, especially where sugarcane is commercially grown, such as Southeast Asia, the Indian subcontinent, North Africa, and Latin America. 
Sugarcane juice is obtained by crushing peeled sugar cane in a mill and is one of the main precursors of rum.

In the United States where processed sugarcane syrup is used as a sweetener in food and beverage manufacturing, "evaporated cane juice" is considered by the Food and Drug Administration (FDA) to be a misleading term for "sugar" on product labels because the FDA regards "juice" as a liquid derived from fruits or vegetables; the preferred term is "cane sugar".

Health risks

Raw sugar cane juice can be a health risk to drinkers due to the unhygienic conditions under which it is prepared in some countries with lower health standards. There are some diseases that can be transmitted by raw sugar-cane, such as Leptospirosis. In Brazil, sugarcane juice has been linked to cases of Chagas disease, as sugarcane can contain traces of its responsible pathogen, Trypanosoma cruzi, left by infected bugs if not properly cleaned.

Drinking sugarcane juice in Egypt may pose health risks due to contamination with the mycotoxins, aflatoxin B1 and fumonisin B1.

Countries

Burma (Myanmar) 

In Burma (Myanmar), sugarcane juice is called kyan ye (ကြံရည်) and is available throughout the country. It is typically brewed during the summertime, and optionally blended with lime, jujube, or orange.

Egypt
In Egypt, sugarcane juice is known as asab and is sold in juice shops around the country. The largest juice shop in Egypt is in Saft El Laban, Giza. Egyptians also mix lemon with asab and let it ferment to produce a fermented variant of the drink. The most highly prized asab comes from Minya, Egypt.

India
Sugarcane juice is sold by street vendors throughout India. The vendors put the sugarcane in a machine, which presses and extracts the sugarcane juice out. Sugarcane juice is usually served with a dash of lime and/or ginger juice. It is a very popular drink, especially during summer months, as a refreshing form of heat relief.

Indonesia

In Indonesia, sugarcane juice drink is called minuman sari tebu. The iced sugar cane juice is called es tebu. In Indonesian, tebu is sugarcane and es is ice. It is one of the traditional beverages commonly sold street-side in Indonesia. The sugarcane plant has been cultivated in Java since ancient times. The earliest record comes from a 9th-century inscription, dated from the Medang Mataram period, that describes a sweet drink called Nalaka Rasa, which translates as "sugarcane juice".

The juice is extracted using a pressing machine to squeeze the sugary sap from sugarcane. The machine might be human-powered, or powered by a gasoline engine or electricity. The juice sold there is always served cold with ice cubes. Traditionally, it is sold throughout the country, especially among street vendors that set their stall on the street side. Today, cleaner vendors work in food courts of malls and shopping centers.

Brazil
Sugarcane juice, known locally as caldo de cana, is sold by street vendors in Brazil. In a process similar to that of the street vendors of India, machines are used to press the sugarcane and the juice is extracted. It is sometimes served with lemon or pineapple juice.

United States
In the United States, where the FDA regulates the description of ingredients on food labels, the term "sugarcane juice" cannot be used because it misleads consumers to believe that cane juice is similar to fruit or vegetable juices. Instead, the FDA recommends "cane sugar" or another term determined by manufacturers who should "review the final guidance and consider whether their labeling terminology accurately describes the basic nature and characterizing properties of the sweetener used".

Madagascar
In the eastern region of Madagascar, sugarcane juice is fermented to make an inexpensive alcoholic beverage called betsa-betsa. The drink is popular with locals because it is cheaper than beer.

Pakistan
The government of Pakistan has declared sugarcane juice as the country's national drink.

Vietnam
Sugarcane juice, called nước mía or mía đá, is common in Vietnam as a drink. Other fruit juices may be added to balance the sweetness, such as kumquat or chanh muối. It is sold at street stalls in plastic bags filled with ice or in disposable plastic cups.

See also

 List of Indian drinks
 List of juices

References

Syrup
Sugars
Non-alcoholic drinks
Brazilian drinks
Burmese cuisine
Cambodian drinks
Indian drinks
Articles containing video clips
Juice